Girolamo Grillo (18 August 1930, Parghelia – 22 August 2016, Odorheiu Secuiesc) was an Italian Roman Catholic bishop.

Ordained to the priesthood in 1954, Grillo served as bishop of the Roman Catholic Diocese of Civitavecchia-Tarquinia, Italy from  1988 to 2006.

See also
Roman Catholicism in Italy

Notes

1930 births
2016 deaths
21st-century Italian Roman Catholic bishops
20th-century Italian Roman Catholic bishops